Roelof  "Roel"   van den Broek (born 20 December 1931) is a Dutch religious scholar. He was a professor of Religious History of the Hellenistic period at Utrecht University between 1979 and 1991. He subsequently was a professor of history of Christianity until his retirement in 1997.

Career
Van den Broek was born in Alphen aan den Rijn on 20 December 1931. He attended the gymnasium and later studied theology at Utrecht University. In 1972 he obtained his title of Doctor under Gilles Quispel, with a thesis titled: The myth of the Phoenix, according to classical and early Christian traditions. He subsequently worked as scientific employee on the early history of Christianity.

In 1991 he was named professor of history of Christianity. He retired on 1 January 1997. Between 1998 and 2005 he was rector of education institute OVP.

Van den Broek was elected a member of the Royal Netherlands Academy of Arts and Sciences in 1993. He received an honorary doctorate of the Paris-Sorbonne University in 1999.

References

1931 births
Living people
Dutch historians of religion
Historians of Christianity
Members of the Royal Netherlands Academy of Arts and Sciences
People from Alphen aan den Rijn
Utrecht University alumni
Academic staff of Utrecht University